José Defran (born 1 January 1938) is a Dominican Republic wrestler. He competed in the men's freestyle 52 kg at the 1968 Summer Olympics.

References

External links
 

1938 births
Living people
Dominican Republic male sport wrestlers
Olympic wrestlers of the Dominican Republic
Wrestlers at the 1968 Summer Olympics
People from La Vega Province